The 1988 Amstel Gold Race was the 23rd edition of the annual road bicycle race "Amstel Gold Race", held on Sunday April 23, 1988, in the Dutch province of Limburg. The race stretched 242 kilometres, with the start in Heerlen and the finish in Meerssen. There were a total of 169 competitors, with 96 cyclists finishing the race.

Result

External links
Results

Amstel Gold Race
April 1988 sports events in Europe
1988 in road cycling
1988 in Dutch sport